Thierry Saïdi (born 20 February 1965 in Épinal) is a French slalom canoeist who competed from the mid-1980s to the late 1990s. He specialized in the C2 event with Emmanuel del Rey being his partner in the boat.

He won eight medals at the ICF Canoe Slalom World Championships with three golds (C2 team: 1989, 1991, 1997), three silvers (C2 team: 1985, 1993, 1995) and two bronzes (C2: 1989, 1991).

Saïdi also competed in two Summer Olympics, earning his best finish of fifth in the C2 event in Atlanta in 1996.

World Cup individual podiums

References

1965 births
Canoeists at the 1992 Summer Olympics
Canoeists at the 1996 Summer Olympics
French male canoeists
Living people
Olympic canoeists of France
Medalists at the ICF Canoe Slalom World Championships
Sportspeople from Épinal